Larry Martin Hagman (September 21, 1931 – November 23, 2012) was an American film and television actor, director, and producer, best known for playing ruthless oil baron J. R. Ewing in the 1978–1991 primetime television soap opera, Dallas, and the befuddled astronaut Major Anthony Nelson in the 1965–1970 sitcom I Dream of Jeannie. Hagman had supporting roles in numerous films, including Fail-Safe, Harry and Tonto, S.O.B.,  Nixon, and Primary Colors. His television appearances also included guest roles on dozens of shows spanning from the late 1950s until his death, and a reprise of his signature role on the 2012 revival of Dallas. Hagman also worked as a television producer and director. He was the son of actress Mary Martin. Hagman underwent a life-saving liver transplant in 1995. He died on November 23, 2012, from complications of acute myeloid leukemia.

Early life
Hagman was born on September 21, 1931, in Fort Worth, Texas. His mother, Mary Martin, became a Broadway actress and musical comedy star after his birth. His father, Benjamin Jackson Hagman, who was of Swedish descent, was an accountant and lawyer who worked as a district attorney. Hagman's parents divorced in 1936 when he was five years old. He lived with his maternal grandmother, Juanita Presley Martin, in Texas and California, while his mother became a contract player with Paramount in 1938. In 1940, Hagman's mother met and married Richard Halliday before giving birth to a daughter, Heller, the following year. Hagman attended a strict academy, Black-Foxe Military Institute and briefly Woodstock Country School, a boarding school in Vermont.

When his mother moved to New York City to resume her Broadway career, Hagman again lived with his grandmother in California. A few years later, his grandmother died, so Hagman joined his mother in New York City. In 1946, Hagman moved back to his hometown of Weatherford, and attended Weatherford High School, from which he graduated. One summer, he worked for oilfield-equipment maker Antelope Tool Company. Although his father wanted Hagman to become a lawyer and join his practice, he was drawn to drama classes and reportedly fell in love with the stage. He graduated from high school in 1949, and decided to pursue acting. He attended Bard College, New York, majoring in dance and drama, but dropped out after one year.

Career
Hagman began his career in 1950 acting in productions at Margaret Webster's school at the Woodstock Playhouse in Woodstock, New York. That summer, during a break from his one year at Bard College, he worked in Dallas as a production assistant and acting in small roles in Margo Jones's theater company. He appeared in The Taming of the Shrew in New York City, followed by numerous tent show musicals with St. John Terrell's Music Circus in St. Petersburg, Florida and Lambertville, New Jersey. In 1951, Hagman appeared in the London production of South Pacific with his mother and stayed in the show for nearly a year. In 1952, Hagman received his draft notice and enlisted in the United States Air Force.

Stationed in London, he spent the majority of his military service entertaining U.S. troops in the United Kingdom and at bases in Europe. After leaving the Air Force in 1956, Hagman returned to New York City, where he appeared in the off-Broadway play Once Around the Block, by William Saroyan. That was followed by nearly a year in another off-Broadway play, James Lee's Career. His Broadway debut occurred in 1958 in Comes a Day. Hagman appeared in four other Broadway plays, God and Kate Murphy, The Nervous Set, The Warm Peninsula and The Beauty Part. During this period, he also appeared in numerous, mostly live, television programs.

Hagman's first television role was as Kenneth Davidson in the 1957 episode "Saturday Lost" of the syndicated crime drama, Decoy, starring Beverly Garland as the first female police officer in a television lead. In 1958, he joined Barbara Bain as a guest star in the short-lived adventure-drama series Harbormaster and appeared three times on Lloyd Bridges' syndicated adventure series, Sea Hunt. In 1960, he was cast in the CBS summer medical series Diagnosis: Unknown in the role of Don Harding in the episode, "The Case of the Radiant Wine". In 1961, Hagman joined the cast of daytime soap opera The Edge of Night as Ed Gibson and stayed in that role for two years. In 1963 and 1964, he appeared twice in segments of the CBS legal drama, The Defenders

In 1964, he made his film debut in Ensign Pulver, which featured a young Jack Nicholson. That same year, he also appeared in Fail-Safe, with Henry Fonda.

I Dream of Jeannie

In 1965, Hagman was cast as "genie" Barbara Eden's master and eventual love interest, Air Force Captain (later Major) Anthony Nelson, in the NBC situation comedy I Dream of Jeannie, which ran for five seasons from 1965 to 1970. The show entered the top 30 in its first year and was NBC's answer to the successful 1960s magical comedies, Bewitched on ABC and My Favorite Martian on CBS. Two reunion movies were later made, both televised on NBC: I Dream of Jeannie... Fifteen Years Later (1985) and I Still Dream of Jeannie (1991), but Hagman did not appear in either of them. At Dragon Con, in 2010, Hagman said he was never approached about it.

In 1999, after 29 years, Hagman agreed to reunite with Jeannie co-stars Barbara Eden and Bill Daily and creator/producer Sidney Sheldon on The Donny and Marie Show. In 2002, when I Dream of Jeannie was set to join the cable channel TV Land, Hagman once again took part in a reunion with Eden and Daily, this time on Larry King Live. On the TV Land Awards in March 2004, Hagman and Eden were the first presenters to reunite on stage. The following October, Hagman and Daily appeared at the Ray Courts Hollywood Autograph Show. And the following year, 2005, brought all three surviving stars from I Dream of Jeannie to the first cast reunion at the Chiller Expo Show.

Hagman and Eden reunited in March 2006 for a publicity tour in New York City to promote the first-season DVD of I Dream of Jeannie. He reunited once again with Eden on stage in the play Love Letters at the College of Staten Island in New York and the United States Military Academy, West Point, New York. The appearance marked the first time the two performers had acted together since Eden appeared with Hagman in a five-episode arc on Dallas in 1990.

Dallas
In 1978, Hagman was offered two roles on two television series that were debuting. One was for The Waverly Wonders and the other for Dallas, in the role of conniving elder son and businessman J.R. Ewing. When Hagman read the Dallas script at his wife's suggestion, they both concluded it was perfect for him. Hagman based his portrayal in part on Jess Hall Jr., the owner of Antelope Tool and Supply Company, where Hagman had worked as a young man.

Dallas became a worldwide success, airing in 90 countries, most notably the United Kingdom, where it was enjoyed even by members of the country's royal family, and led to several successful primetime spin-offs. Hagman became one of the best-known television stars of the era. Producers were keen to capitalize on that love/hate family relationship of J.R., building anticipation to a fever pitch in "A House Divided", the 1980 cliffhanger season finale in which J.R. is shot by an unknown assailant, leading to the world-wide "Who shot J.R.?" phenomenon. 

At the beginning of the fourth season later that year, audience and actors were trying to guess "Who shot J.R.?", now one of fictional TV's most famous questions. During the media buildup, Hagman was involved in contract negotiations, delaying his return in the fourth season. Holding out for a higher salary, Hagman did not appear in the first episode of the show until the final few minutes. Producers were faced with a dilemma of whether to pay the greatly increased salary or to write J.R. out of the program. Lorimar Productions, the makers of the series, began shooting different scenes of Dallas that did not include Hagman. In the midst of negotiations, Hagman took his family to London for their July vacation. He continued to fight for his demands and network executives conceded that they wanted J.R. to remain on Dallas. From then on, Hagman became one of the highest-paid stars in television. At the beginning of the 1980–81 season, writers were told to keep the storylines away from the actors until they really found out who actually shot J.R. and three weeks passed until the culprit was revealed on November 21, 1980, in a ratings record-breaking episode.

For his performance as J.R. Ewing, Hagman was nominated for two Emmy Awards for Outstanding Lead Actor in a Drama Series in 1980 and 1981, but did not win. He was also nominated for four Golden Globe Awards, between 1981 and 1985. He was nominated for a Soap Opera Digest award seven times for Outstanding Villain on a Prime Time Serial, Outstanding Actor in a Leading Role on a Prime Time Serial, Favorite Super Couple: Prime Time and Outstanding Actor in a Comic Relief Role on a Prime Time Serial and won five times. Hagman received the Golden Plate Award of the American Academy of Achievement from Academy member Ray Lee Hunt at the 1981 Achievement Summit in Dallas. In 1984, co-star Barbara Bel Geddes left Dallas, following a contract dispute that had resulted from her March 1983 quadruple heart bypass surgery. At one point, Hagman suggested to his real-life mother Mary Martin that she play Miss Ellie, but she rejected the suggestion and Bel Geddes was briefly replaced by Donna Reed for the 1984–1985 season, before Bel Geddes returned in better health for the 1985–1986 season. By the end of its 14th season in 1991, ratings had slipped to the extent that CBS decided to end Dallas. Hagman was the only actor to appear in all 357 episodes. He had also made five guest appearances on the Dallas spin-off series Knots Landing in the early 1980s. Some years after Dallas ended, Hagman appeared in two subsequent Dallas television movies: J.R. Returns in 1996 and War of the Ewings in 1998.

Hagman reprised his role as J.R. Ewing in TNT's continuation of Dallas, which began in 2012. In 2011, while filming the new series, Hagman said, "Of course it's fun to play the villain." As a result of Hagman's death in 2012, his character J.R. was killed off in season two of Dallas. Unused footage of Hagman was used in season three as part of the season's story arc, which aired in 2014.

Other work

Television 

Hagman starred in two short-lived series in the 1970s, The Good Life (1971–1972) and Here We Go Again (1973). In 1993, Hagman starred in Staying Afloat as a down-on-his-luck former millionaire who agrees to work undercover with the FBI to maintain his playboy lifestyle. Originally ordered for two TV movies and a weekly series by NBC, the pilot movie aired in November 1993 to critical drubbing and low ratings, ending production.

In January 1997, Hagman starred in a short-lived television series titled Orleans as Judge Luther Charbonnet, which lasted only eight episodes. In 2002, he made an appearance in the fourth series of Vic Reeves and Bob Mortimer's British comedy panel game, Shooting Stars, often appearing bewildered at the nonsensical questions and the antics of the hosts - during the show Hagman even stated that he would fire his agent as a result. In January 2011, Hagman made a guest appearance in the seventh season of Desperate Housewives as a new husband for Lynette Scavo's mother, Stella (played by Polly Bergen).

He also directed episodes of I Dream of Jeannie and The Good Life, as well as several episodes of Dallas and In the Heat of the Night, which was the only series he directed, but in which he did not act.

Film 
Hagman appeared in such feature films as The Group, Fail-Safe, Harry and Tonto, Mother, Jugs & Speed, In Harm's Way, The Eagle Has Landed, Superman, S.O.B., Nixon and Primary Colors. His television work included Getting Away from It All, Sidekicks, The Return of the World's Greatest Detective, Intimate Strangers, Checkered Flag or Crash and A Howling in the Woods

Hagman also directed (and appeared briefly in) a low-budget comedy and horror film in 1972 called Beware! The Blob, also called Son of Blob, a sequel to the classic 1958 horror film The Blob. This was the only feature film he directed.

Music
The release of a Columbia single performed with his mother Mary Martin, Get Out Those Old Records, in 1950, was credited to Mary Martin and her Son Larry, with orchestration by Mitch Miller. It was released in Australia as a-78 rpm single, catalogue number DO-3409.

In 1980, Hagman recorded a single called "Ballad of the Good Luck Charm".

Product spokesman
During the 1980s, Hagman was featured in a national televised Schlitz beer campaign, playing on, but not explicitly featuring, the J.R. character. He wore the same kind of Western business outfit – complete with cowboy hat – that he wore in his role. The end of each 30-second spot featured a male voice-over saying, "Refreshing Schlitz beer...the gusto's back..." Hagman, grinning into the camera, added: "...and I'm gonna get it!" He also made commercials for BVD brand underwear.

In 2010, Hagman was hired as a spokesman for SolarWorld, a German solar energy commercial enterprise. While the SolarWorld commercials specifically mention neither Dallas nor J. R. Ewing, Hagman essentially revisits the character (complete with a picture of Hagman as J. R. Ewing from the original series on the mantle), stating that his oil company days are long over, "though still in the energy business", meaning solar energy, instead, which alternative energy now plays a major part of the next-generation Ewing family war between Christopher and John Ross III.

Personal life

In 1973, his stepfather Richard Halliday died and Hagman reconciled with his mother, Mary Martin, soon after. The two were close until her death from colon cancer in 1990.

In 1954, Hagman married Swedish-born Maj Axelsson (born May 13, 1928, in Eskilstuna, Södermanlands län, Sweden – died May 31, 2016, in Los Angeles, California); they had two children, Heidi Kristina (born 1958) and Preston (born 1962). Longtime residents of Malibu, California, they then moved to Ojai. Hagman was a member of the Peace and Freedom Party from the 1960s. Hagman derided U.S. President George W. Bush prior to the Iraq War.

In 1969, Hagman's friend, musician David Crosby, supplied him with LSD after a concert: "LSD was such a profound experience in my life that it changed my pattern of life and my way of thinking and I could not exclude it [from my autobiography]." Hagman was introduced to marijuana by Jack Nicholson as a safer alternative to Hagman's heavy drinking. "I liked it because it was fun, it made me feel good and I never had a hangover." Although Hagman was a member of a 12-step program, he publicly advocated marijuana as a better alternative to alcohol.

In 1995, Hagman underwent a life-saving liver transplant after he was diagnosed with liver cancer, which was most likely brought on by roughly 40 years of heavy drinking. His clinical picture was further complicated by cirrhosis of the liver, which had been diagnosed three years earlier in 1992.  Hagman did not receive preferential treatment as a celebrity, with a 1995 UPI article stating that the donor liver "matched Hagman's anonymous physical profile listed with the United Network for Organ Sharing."

He was also a heavy smoker as a young man before quitting at age 34.  He was the chairman of the American Cancer Society's annual Great American Smokeout for many years and also worked on behalf of the National Kidney Foundation.

After attending a soccer game in Bucharest between FC Steaua București and West Ham United, he became a well-known fan of the Romanian team.

In 2001, Hagman wrote his autobiography titled Hello Darlin': Tall (and Absolutely True) Tales About My Life. In a 2007 interview, Hagman discussed his support for alternative energy. On a 2008 episode of Living With Ed, Hagman and his wife showed actor Ed Begley Jr. their solar-powered, super-energy efficient home named "Heaven" and talked about their green lifestyle. Maj Hagman was diagnosed with Alzheimer's disease in 2008 and Hagman at first took the lead in caring for her, but her condition deteriorated. By 2010, she required 24-hour nursing care. As a result, Hagman put their 43-acre estate in Ojai up for sale listing it at $11 million.

Friendship with Carroll O'Connor
Hagman had a long friendship with actor Carroll O'Connor, beginning in 1959 when Hagman was starring in the Broadway play God and Kate Murphy and O'Connor was working as an assistant stage manager. Later, as the two struggled as young actors, they rented apartments near each other in New York. Over the years, they had much in common. O'Connor renegotiated his contract over his salary on All in the Family in 1974, causing him to miss two episodes and Hagman did the same during his tenure with Dallas, with similar results. Hagman's daughter Heidi, whom O'Connor had known since her childhood, joined the cast for one season of Archie Bunker's Place. Hagman directed several episodes of O'Connor's later series In the Heat of the Night. They both endured serious health issues: O'Connor underwent heart bypass surgery and Hagman received a liver transplant. The two remained close after the death of O'Connor's son Hugh and Hagman delivered a eulogy at the funeral.

Illness and death
In June 2011, Hagman said he had stage 2 throat cancer. He commented, "As J. R. I could get away with anything — bribery, blackmail and adultery, but I got caught by cancer. I do want everyone to know that it is a very common and treatable form of cancer. I will be receiving treatment while working on the new Dallas series. I could not think of a better place to be than working on a show I love, with people I love." Hagman had an acorn-sized tumor removed from his tongue in 2011. In June 2012, the cancer was said to be in remission. Then, in July 2012, doctors diagnosed Hagman with myelodysplastic syndrome (formerly known as preleukemia).

Hagman died on November 23, 2012, at Medical City Dallas Hospital in Dallas following complications from acute myeloid leukemia, after being interviewed for the National Geographic documentary, The '80s: The Decade that Made Us, which aired in April 2013. In a statement to the Dallas Morning News, Hagman's family said: "Larry's family and close friends had joined him in Dallas for the Thanksgiving holiday. He died surrounded by loved ones. It was a peaceful passing, just as he had wished for." The New York Times described him as "one of television's most beloved villains".

Tributes
Actress Barbara Eden, a longtime friend of Hagman's, who played Jeannie on I Dream of Jeannie and Lee Ann de la Vega on Dallas, said: "Larry was one of the most intelligent actors I ever worked with. He more than hit his marks. And when you're working with another actor, you know immediately if the ball isn't tossed back. Plus, Larry was savvy about the business, which I wasn't." In an interview with Australia's News 10, she commented that their on-screen chemistry on the set of Jeannie "was not work" and "our timing was right. I can't even explain it. It was wonderful."

Actress Linda Gray, who played Sue Ellen Ewing on Dallas, called Hagman her "best friend for 35 years" and was at his bedside when he died, her agent told the BBC. In a statement, she said: "He was the Pied Piper of life and brought joy to everyone he knew. He was creative, generous, funny, loving and talented and I will miss him enormously. He was an original and lived life to the fullest."

Actor Patrick Duffy, who played Bobby Ewing on Dallas, was also at his bedside when he died. In a statement, he said: "Friday, I lost one of the greatest friends ever to grace my life. The loneliness is only what is difficult, as Larry’s peace and comfort is always what is important to me, now as when he was here. He was a fighter in the gentlest way, against his obstacles and for his friends. I wear his friendship with honor."

TV and filmography

Search for Tomorrow (1951) (TV series) (1957) as Curt Williams
The Edge of Night (1956) (TV series) as Ed Gibson
The West Point Story (1956) (TV series) Miscredited
Decoy (1957) (TV series) as Kenneth Davidson
The Outcasts of Poker Flat (1958) (TV film) 
Sea Hunt (1958–1959) (TV series)
Once Around the Block (1960) (The Play of the Week) as Officer Joe Smith
The Silver Burro (1963) (TV film) 
The Cavern (1964) as Capt. Wilson
Ensign Pulver (1964) as Billings
Fail Safe (1964) as Buck
The Rogues (1964) (TV series)
In Harm's Way (1965) as Lieutenant Cline
I Dream of Jeannie (1965–1970) (TV series) as Major Anthony Nelson / Various characters
The Group (1966) as Harald Peterson
Three's a Crowd (1969) (TV film) as Jim Carson
Up in the Cellar (1970) as Maurice Camber
Night Gallery (1970) (TV series) as Cedric Acton (segment "The Housekeeper")
Vanished (1971) (TV-film) as Jerry Freytag
The Hired Hand (1971) (TV film) as Sheriff (uncredited)
A Howling in the Woods (1971) (TV film) as Eddie Crocker
The Good Life (1971) (TV series) as Albert Miller
Getting Away from It All (1972) (TV film) as Fred Clark
Beware! The Blob (1972) as Young Hobo (directorial debut)
No Place to Run (1972) (TV film) as Jay Fox
Applause (1973) (TV) as Bill Sampson
Here We Go Again (1973) (TV-series) as Richard Evans
The Toy Game (1973) as Major
The Alpha Caper (1973) (TV) as Tudor
Blood Sport (1973) (TV) as Coach Marshall
What Are Best Friends For? (1973) (TV film) as Frank Ross
Antonio (1973) as Mark Hunter
Sidekicks (1974) (TV film) as Quince Drew
Harry and Tonto (1974) as Eddie
Hurricane (1974) (TV film) as Paul Damon
Stardust (1974) as Porter Lee Austin
Sarah T. – Portrait of a Teenage Alcoholic (1975) (TV film) as Jerry Travis
Police Woman (1974 TV Series) – Series 1 Episode 4 as Tony Bonner
The Big Rip-Off (1975) (TV film) as Frank Darnell
Ellery Queen – The Adventure of the Mad Tea Party (1975) (TV  series, one episode) as Paul Gardner
Mother, Jugs & Speed (1976) as Murdoch
The Return of the World's Greatest Detective (1976) (TV film) as Sherman Holmes
The Big Bus (1976) as Parking Lot Doctor
The Eagle Has Landed (1976) as Col. Clarence E. Pitts
The Rhinemann Exchange (1977) (TV miniseries) as Col. Edmund Pace
Checkered Flag or Crash (1977) as Bo Cochran
Intimate Strangers (1977) (TV film) as Mort Burns
The Rockford Files (1977) (TV series, one episode) as Richard Lessing
The President's Mistress (1978) (TV film) as Ed Murphy
Last of the Good Guys (1978) (TV film) as Sergeant Frank O'Malley
Superman (1978) as Major
A Double Life (1978) (TV film) as Doyle Rettig
Dallas (1978–1991) (TV series) as J.R. Ewing
Knots Landing (1980–1982) (TV series) as J.R. Ewing
S.O.B. (1981) as Dick Benson
I Am Blushing (1981) as Larry Hagman
Deadly Encounter (1982) (TV film) as Sam
Dallas: The Early Years (1986) (TV film) as J.R. Ewing
Lone Star (1986) (TV documentary) 
The Richest Cat in the World  (1986) as Leo Kohlmeyer (voice, uncredited)
The Simpsons  (1989) (TV series) (one episode, 2006) as Wallace Brady
Ein Schloß am Wörthersee (1992, 1993–1994) (German TV series) as Himself
Staying Afloat (1993) (TV film) as Alexander Hollingsworth III
Nixon (1995) as Jack Jones
Dallas: J.R. Returns (1996) (TV film) as J.R. Ewing
Orleans (1997) (TV series) as Judge Luther Charbonnet
The Third Twin (1997) (TV film) as Berrington Jones
Primary Colors (1998) as Gov. Fred Picker
Dallas: War of the Ewings (1998) (TV film) as J.R. Ewing
Dallas Reunion: The Return to Southfork (2004) (TV special) as Himself / J.R. Ewing
Nip/Tuck (2006) (TV series) as Burt Landau
Lindenstraße (2006) (German soap opera) as Himself 
Fuel (2008) as Himself 
Somos cómplices (2009) (Spanish soap opera) as Richard Slater
Desperate Housewives (2010) (TV series) as Frank Kaminsky
Das Traumschiff (2010)  (German TV-Series) as Larry Hagman
The Flight of the Swan (2011) as Corporate President
 Ushi and the Family (2011) (Dutch TV-Series) as Hairy Legman
Dallas (2012–2013) (TV series) as J.R. Ewing
I Get That a Lot (2013) (released posthumously)

Stage
South Pacific (1950) London
The Taming of the Shrew (1951) Broadway
Comes a Day (1958) Broadway
God and Kate Murphy (1958) Broadway
The Nervous Set (1959) Broadway
The Warm Peninsula (1959) Broadway
The Beauty Part (1962) Broadway
Love Letters (2005 - 2006) tour

References

External links

 
 
 Larry Hagman at Legacy.com
 
 
 
 
 
 Larry Hagman at Classic Television Showbiz
 

1931 births
2012 deaths
20th-century American male actors
21st-century American male actors
21st-century American non-fiction writers
American autobiographers
American cannabis activists
American male film actors
American male soap opera actors
American male stage actors
American male television actors
American people of Swedish descent
American television directors
Bard College alumni
California Democrats
Deaths from cancer in Texas
Deaths from acute myeloid leukemia
Deaths from myelodysplastic syndrome
Film directors from California
Film directors from New York City
Film directors from Texas
Liver transplant recipients
Male actors from Fort Worth, Texas
Male actors from Malibu, California
Military personnel from Texas
People from Ojai, California
Television producers from California
Television producers from New York City
Television producers from Texas
Texas Democrats
Trinity School (New York City) alumni
United States Air Force airmen
Writers from California
Writers from Texas